Kellner is an unincorporated community located in Portage and Wood counties, Wisconsin, United States. The Portage County portion of Kellner is located in the town of Grant, while the Wood County portion is located in the town of Grand Rapids.

History
Kellner was laid out in 1901, and named after F. E. Kellner, a land agent.

References

External links
 1909 plat map of Kellner
 1928 plat map

Unincorporated communities in Portage County, Wisconsin
Unincorporated communities in Wood County, Wisconsin
Unincorporated communities in Wisconsin